Simon & Halbig was a doll manufacturer known for bisque doll heads with subtle colouring. They were based in Thuringia, the centre of the German doll industry. They supplied doll heads to many other well known doll makers. These are now collectables.

Description 
Bisque or biscuit porcelain is unglazed porcelain with a matte finish, giving it a realistic skin-like texture. It is usually tinted or painted a realistic skin color. The bisque head is attached to a body made of cloth or leather, or a jointed body made of wood, papier-mâché or composition, a mix of pulp, sawdust, glue and similar materials. Many, like Simon & Halbig,  came from the Thuringia region, which has natural deposits of the clay used to make the dolls.

Simon & Halbig was known for excellent sculpting of their doll heads, and the high quality of their bisque (porcelain).

German childlike dolls were predominantly produced between 1890 and 1930.

Examples of these dolls can be found in the Barry Elder collection in the Judges' Lodgings Museum, Lancaster

History
Simon & Halbig was founded in 1839 and began making dolls from 1869 in their two porcelain factories in Gräfenhain and Hildburghausen in Thuringia, Germany.

In 1902 they started a co-operation with Kämmer of Kämmer & Reinhardt in which Kämmer modelled heads and the firm produced them.  The heads of the dolls completed by Kämmer & Reinhardt, attached to bodies and legs of more durable composition, were stamped with the marks of both firms. In 1920, Simon & Halbig was bought by Kämmer & Reinhardt, who continued to produce dolls until 1932.  The factory became known as Keramisches Werk Gräfenhain.

Innovations

Literature

Companies using Simon & Halbig heads
American firms
 Arranbee
 Bawo & Dotter
 George Borgfeldt
 Edison Phonograph Toy Manufacturing Company
 Gimbel Brothers
 Strobel & Wilken
 John Wanamaker
German firms
 C.M. Bergmann
 Gebrüder Bing
 Carl Bergner
 Cuno & Otto Dressel
 Eekhoff
 Hamburger & Co
 Heinrich Handwerck
 Adolf Hülß
 
 Louis Linder & Sohn
 Franz Schmidt
 FAO Schwarz
 Schoenau & Hoffmeister
 Wagner & Zetzsche
 Welsch & Co
 Wiesenthal, Schindel & Kallenberg
 Adolf Wislizenus
French-German firms 
 Fleischmann & Bloedel
French firms 
 Jumeau
 Roullet & Decamps
 S.F.B.J.

See also
Bisque doll

References

External links

Doll manufacturing companies
1839 establishments in Germany